Oleksandr Melaschenko (born 13 December 1978) is a Ukrainian footballer. He played as a striker.

Career
In 2013, he played for FC Nove Zhyttya in the Poltava Oblast league.  His previous clubs include Vorskla Poltava, Dynamo Kyiv, Dnipro Dnipropetrovsk and Kryvbas Kryvyi Rih and ended his professional career with Metalurh Zaporizhzhia. In 2001, playing for Dynamo Kyiv, he was voted as the third best Ukrainian Footballer of the Year, after Andriy Shevchenko, and Hennady Zubov.

Melaschenko has made 16 appearances for the Ukraine national football team, and participated in the 2002 FIFA World Cup qualification rounds.

References

External links

1978 births
Living people
Sportspeople from Poltava
Ukrainian footballers
Ukraine international footballers
Association football forwards
Ukrainian Premier League players
FC Dynamo Kyiv players
FC Dynamo-2 Kyiv players
FC Vorskla Poltava players
FC Vorskla-2 Poltava players
FC Kryvbas Kryvyi Rih players
FC Dnipro players
FC Dnipro-2 Dnipropetrovsk players
FC Metalurh Zaporizhzhia players
FC Nove Zhyttya Andriivka players
Ukrainian football managers